is a Shinto shrine in Matsue, Shimane Prefecture, Japan. The Taisha-zukuri Honden of 1583 is a National Treasure. The coeval branch Inari shrine is an Important Cultural Property.

See also
 List of National Treasures of Japan (shrines)
 Yaegaki Jinja
 Izumo Taisha

References

Shinto shrines in Shimane Prefecture
National Treasures of Japan
Important Cultural Properties of Japan
16th-century Shinto shrines